Virtual Studios LLC was an American film financier, distributor and production studio based in The United States of America.

History

Establishment and early years
Virtual Studios was founded by film directors and producers Tibor Hernadí and Benjamin Waisbren in 1986 as a film financier and media company. The funding was backed by Hedge fund, Pacific Title, and Stark Investments.

Film industry
The companies first film production and financing credits were the comedy-romance film Duane Hopwood and the dystopian political thriller film V for Vendetta in 2005. In 2006 they signed a deal to produce and finance films in association with Warner Bros. Their next films (Poseidon, V for Vendetta, The Good German and 300) were all distributed by Warner Bros. The Assassination of Jesse James by the Coward Robert Ford was their last film they co-produced for Warner Bros. and the deal was signed off. Their last film was Bangkok Dangerous and the company was left dormant after the film became a box-office flop.

Virtual Films

Virtual Studios started a film distribution company called Virtual Films in early 2006. The company was short-lived and only lasted a year, and it was shut down in 2007. First Born was the only film Virtual Films distributed.

Closure
Virtual Studios ultimately closed in 2009 after being dormant for a year due to Hernadí and Waisbrein leaving the company to pursue other ventures.

Films

References 

Film production companies of the United States
Defunct American film studios
Mass media companies established in 1986
Mass media companies disestablished in 2009